You've Been Spiked is a 2004 album by Chris Joss.

Track listing
Discothèque Dancing
You've Been Spiked
Drink Me Hot
Wrong Alley Street (Part 1)
Riviera 69
Shellah V.
Wrong Alley Street (Part 3)
Waves Of Love
A Part In That Show
Early Morning Wanderings
Waking Up In The Park
The Man With A Suitcase (bonus Track)
The Wait (bonus track)

References

2004 albums
Chris Joss albums